Buffalo Dance is an 1894 black-and-white silent film from Edison Studios, produced by William K. L. Dickson with William Heise as cinematographer. Filmed on a single reel, using standard 35 mm gauge, it has a 16-second runtime. The film was shot in Edison's Black Maria studio at the same time as Sioux Ghost Dance. These are two of the earliest films made which feature Native Americans. According to the Edison catalog, the performers in both films were genuine Sioux people wearing traditional costumes and war paint. All were veterans of Buffalo Bill's Wild West show. Buffalo Dance has three dancers and two drummers. Hair Coat, Last Horse and Parts His Hair dance in a circle while drummers Pine and Strong Talker provide their rhythm.

See also
 List of Western films before 1920

References

External links 

 
 
 

1894 films
1894 Western (genre) films
1890s dance films
1894 short films
American black-and-white films
American dance films
American short documentary films
American silent short films
Articles containing video clips
Black-and-white documentary films
Documentary films about Native Americans
Films directed by William Kennedy Dickson
Films shot in New Jersey
Sioux
Silent American Western (genre) films
1890s American films